Duruh (also Romanized as Dūrūh) is a village in Sepidar Rural District, in the Central District of Boyer-Ahmad County, Kohgiluyeh and Boyer-Ahmad Province, Iran. At the 2006 census, its population was 32, in 6 families.

Latitude and Longitude 
The Latitude of Duruh is: 32.28513

The Longitude of Duruh is: 60.49189

References 

Populated places in Boyer-Ahmad County